Jhillu Singh Yadav (born 1950) is an Indian organic chemist and the co-founder of the Indo-French Joint Laboratory for Sustainable Chemistry at Interfaces (JLSCI), jointly established by the Indian Institute of Chemical Technology and the University of Rennes 1. He is a former director of Indian Institute of Chemical Technology (IICT) and is known for his studies on organic syntheses of allylic and acetylenic alcohols and spiroacetals. He is an elected fellow of the Indian National Science Academy, the Indian Academy of Sciences National Academy of Sciences, India, Indian Institute of Chemical Engineers and The World Academy of Sciences. The Council of Scientific and Industrial Research, the apex agency of the Government of India for scientific research, awarded him the Shanti Swarup Bhatnagar Prize for Science and Technology, one of the highest Indian science awards, in 1991, for his contributions to chemical sciences.

Biography 

J. S. Yadav was born on 4 August 1950 at Azamgarh, a town in the eastern border of the Indian state of Uttar Pradesh and after completing his early schooling locally, he did his graduate and master's studies at Banaras Hindu University in 1968. His doctoral studies were at National Chemical Laboratory under the guidance of Sukh Dev and on securing a PhD, he had a short stint  at Rice University during 1977–78. Subsequently, he did his post-doctoral studies at University of Wisconsin from 1979 to 1980 and returned to India to join National Chemical Laboratory as a scientist in 1980. Later, he moved to Indian Institute of Chemical Technology where he served as its director till his superannuation from service. Post-retirement, he continues his association with IICT as a Bhatnagar Fellow of the Council of Scientific and Industrial Research.

Yadav is married to Janaki and the couple has two sons. The family lives in Kadi in Gujarat.

Legacy 
Yadav is known for his studies on the synthesis of complex natural products and drugs and is credited with the development of protocols for synthesizing allylic and acetylenic alcohols and for spiroacetals. His researches are reported to have led to over 100 patents (he holds 47 of them) and have resulted in developing cost effective methodologies for the synthesis of pharmaceutical and agrochemicals such as Diltiazem, Ondasetron, Pyrazinamide, Ketotifen, Mefloquin and Tamoxifin. He has published over 1000 peer-reviewed articles and guided over 110 research scholars in their studies. His work on pheromones assisted in evolving an Integrated Pest Management for developing environmentally friendly agro products. Along with René Grée, he is the founder of the Indo-French Joint Laboratory for Sustainable Chemistry at Interfaces (JLSCI), established jointly by the University of Rennes 1 and the Indian Institute of Chemical Technology where he served as its founder director.

Awards and honours 
The Council of Scientific and Industrial Research awarded Yadav the Shanti Swarup Bhatnagar Prize, one of the highest Indian science awards, in 1991. He received the VASVIK Industrial Research Award in 1999 and the Ranbaxy Research Award in 2000. The year 2003 brought him two awards, Vigyan Ratna Samman and Goyal Award and he received Vigyan Gaurav Samman Award in 2004. He is an elected fellow of all the three major Indian science academies viz. the Indian National Science Academy, National Academy of Sciences, India and Indian Academy of Sciences. He is also a fellow of the Indian Institute of Chemical Engineers and an elected fellow of The World Academy of Sciences. Arkivoc journal issued a festschrift on Yadav by way of its Issue II of 2016.

See also 
 Diltiazem
 Pyrazinamide
 Ketotifen
 Pheromones

References 

Recipients of the Shanti Swarup Bhatnagar Award in Chemical Science
1950 births
Living people
Indian scientific authors
Scientists from Uttar Pradesh
Fellows of the Indian Academy of Sciences
Fellows of the Indian National Science Academy
Indian organic chemists
Banaras Hindu University alumni
Rice University alumni
University of Wisconsin–Madison alumni
Council of Scientific and Industrial Research
Fellows of The National Academy of Sciences, India
TWAS fellows
People from Azamgarh
20th-century Indian inventors